The 1988–89 FIBA Korać Cup was the 18th edition of FIBA's Korać Cup basketball competition. The Yugoslav Partizan defeated the Italian Wiwa Vismara Cantù in the final. This was the third time Partizan won the title, following victories in 1978 and 1979.

First round

|}

*APOEL withdrew before the first leg and Spartak Pleven received a forfeit (2–0) in both games.

Round of 32

|}

*The game interrupted against PAOK B.C at the beginning of the extra time. PAOK'S American coach Johnny Neumann push the Italian referee Grosi, when he impute breach at jump all .

Round of 16

Semi finals

|}

Finals

|}

External links
 1988–89 FIBA Korać Cup @ linguasport.com
1988–89 FIBA Korać Cup

1988–89
1988–89 in European basketball